BrightFarms is an American indoor farming company headquartered in Irvington, New York. It grows and supplies local, non-GMO, pesticide-free, and fresh salad greens to supermarkets.  The produce is grown in computer-controlled hydroponic greenhouses.

History 
BrightFarms was founded by Ted Caplow and Paul Lightfoot in 2010.

As of 2019, BrightFarms had four greenhouses located in Wilmington, Ohio; Rochelle, Illinois; Culpeper County, Virginia; and Bucks County, Pennsylvania. In January 2020, the company opened its largest greenhouse - a 280,000 sq. ft. farm in Selinsgrove, Pennsylvania.

BrightFarms supplies its produce to established grocers including Walmart, Kroger, and Ahold Delhaize. Additionally, it supplies independent grocers in the Midwest, including Dorothy Lane Market. BrightFarms also joined the IBM Food Trust in October 2019.

See also 
 Theodore Caplow

References

External links 
BrightFarms
Hydroponics Store

Hydroponics
Hydroculture